The Montana Women's Prison is located in Billings, Montana, United States. It houses roughly 220 female prisoners. The warden is Jennie Hansen.

References 

Prisons in Montana
Women's prisons in the United States
Buildings and structures in Billings, Montana
1994 establishments in Montana
Women in Montana